Khiri Rat Nikhom railway station is a railway station located in Tha Khanon Subdistrict, Khiri Rat Nikhom District, Surat Thani. It opened in April 1956, on the Southern Line section from Ban Thung Pho Junction–Khiri Rat Nikhom. The railway line was originally planned to reach Tanun (North of Phuket) in Phang Nga, via Phang Nga City, Phanom and Ban Ta Khun, however the plan was scrapped. Currently, there are plans to restart the plan and continue building to Tanun to connect to Phuket and Phang Nga.

Train services 
 Local train No. 489 / 490 Surat Thani–Khiri Rat Nikhom–Surat Thani

References 
 
 
 

Railway stations in Thailand
Railway stations opened in 1956